Alyja Daphne "Jaja" Antonio Santiago (born January 20, 1996) is a Filipino volleyball player who currently plays for Saitama Ageo Medics of the Japan's V.League.

Career

College
Santiago, then an incoming freshman student entering the National University (NU) in Manila, received an offer to try out for the  University of California-Los Angeles' women's volleyball team in 2013. She declined as she was hesitant to be away from her family back in the Philippines. She would go on to play for the NU Lady Bulldogs volleyball team in the University Athletic Association of the Philippines (UAAP).

Santiago would also lead the Bulldogs to win back-to-back championships in the Shakey's V-League 13th Season Collegiate Conference without her sister Dindin to support her, despite that, she was crowned as the Conference Most Valuable Player award and the Best Middle Blocker. She was also crowned as the Most Valuable Player in the 2016 Philippine Super Liga Grand Prix in a back-to-back win with the Foton Tornadoes.

She started her rookie collegiate volleyball career with the UST Golden Tigresses, with her sister Dindin before transferring to National University to follow her sister. After being transferred from UST to the NU Lady Bulldogs, Santiago, now in her 4th year, served as the team captain. She was undecided if she was going to use her fifth and final year, after being eliminated by the UST Golden Tigresses in the UAAP Season 79 Women's Volleyball.

She holds the record of the youngest player to ever play in Shakey's V-League. She joined NU as Guest Player in Season 7 Conference 2 at the age of 14. She also holds the record of the tallest player so far in the Shakey's V-League as she stands 6'5".

Club

Foton Tornadoes (2015–2018)
Her first professional team, the Foton Tornadoes, debuted in the 2015 Grand Prix Conference of the Philippine Super Liga (PSL) and played for 3 conferences (2015 Philippine Super Liga Grand Prix, 2016 Philippine Super Liga All-Filipino and 2016 Philippine Super Liga Grand Prix).

In 2017, Santiago won the Premier Volleyball League 1st Season Collegiate Conference championship with the NU Lady Bulldogs and was named the conference MVP. Also winning the bronze medal in the PSL Grand Prix Conference with the Foton Tornadoes along with the 1st Best Opposite Spiker award.

PSL All Stars
Santiago was part of the PSL All Stars selection team formed to represent the hosts of the 2016 FIVB Club World Championship which was held in Manila.

Ageo Medics (2018–2019)
Santiago joined Ageo Medics of Japan's V.League in 2018 for the 2018–19 season.

Foton Tornadoes (2019)
Santiago returned the Philippines to feature for the Foton Tornadoes in the 2019 PSL All-Filipino Conference. Following the conclusion of the tournament, she returned to Japan to play for Ageo Medics again.

Ageo Medics (2019–2021)
Santiago helped Ageo Medics clinch a bronze medal finish in the 2019–20 Division 1.

Santiago renewed her contract with Ageo Medics in August 2020 She went on to help Ageo Medics win the Division 1 V.Cup title, which was the first for Santiago with a foreign club. after she was unable to rejoin Foton, which renamed themselves as Chery Tigo, for the 2020 PSL Grand Prix which was cancelled due to the COVID-19 pandemic.

Shortly after, Santiago bared that Ageo Medics has convinced her to change her citizenship to Japanese through naturalization which would enable the club to field her as a local. However, Santiago was non-committal and maintained that she still has pride in being a Filipino citizen.

Chery Tiggo
Her contract with Ageo Medics expired after her 2021 V.Cup stint. Santiago returned to the Philippines to play for the Chery Tiggo 7 Pro Crossovers, which has transferred from the PSL to the newly fully-professionalized Premier Volleyball League (PVL). She rejected offer to play for a club in Taiwan so she could play for Chery in the PVL.

Ageo Medics (2022–)
She returns once again in Japan to suit up for Ageo Medics for the 2022–23 V.League season.

National team
Santiago was also a member of the Philippine national team that played in Singapore during the 2015 Southeast Asian Games and played in Kuala Lumpur, the 2017 Southeast Asian Games. She last played for the national team in 2022 at the 2021 Southeast Asian Games which was held in Vietnam.

Personal life
Santiago comes from a family of sportspeople. His father Jojo was a basketballer who played for the University of Manila Hawks and the San Juan Knights in the now defunct Metropolitan Basketball Association. Her older sister Dindin Santiago-Manabat also grew up to be a professional volleyball player. Her older brother Axel has coached the National University (NU) Bulldogs volleyball teams. Her younger brother Lenard played basketball for the Letran Squires junior team.Her father died in 2014. Their mother worked as an Overseas Filipino Worker in Israel.

She obtained a bachelor's degree in psychology in 2020 at NU, two years after her stint in the UAAP.

Santiago is engaged with Japanese coach Taka Minowa of Ageo Medics since August 2022. She previously had Chery teammate Maika Ortiz as her girlfriend. Santiago announced that they had end their relationship on July 2022.

In January 2023 reportedly also began the process of acquiring Japanese citizenship for herself. However she clarified that nothing is certain and is considering opportunities outside of Japan. She has received an offer from her club Ageo Medics to help her acquire Japanese citizenship as early as April 2021 which would make her eligible to play for the Japanese national team.

Clubs
  PLDT Home Telpad Turbo Boosters (2014–2015)
  Foton Tornadoes (2015–2019)
  Ageo Medics (2018–present)
  Chery Tiggo 7 Pro Crossovers (2021-present)

Awards

Individuals
 2010 UAAP Season 72 Girls' Volleyball "Rookie of the Year"
 2012 UAAP Season 75 Girls' Volleyball "Best Attacker"
 2013 UAAP Season 76 "Rookie of the Year"
 2014 Shakey's V-League 11th Season Open Conference "Best Attacker"
 2015 UAAP Season 77 "Best Attacker"
 2015 Shakey's V-League 12th Season Open Conference "Finals' Most Valuable Player"
 2015 Shakey's V-League 12th Season Open Conference "2nd Best Middle Blocker"
 2015 Philippine Superliga Grand Prix "2nd Best Middle Blocker"
 2016 Shakey's V-League 13th Season Open Conference "1st Best Middle Blocker"
 2016 Shakey's V-League 13th Season Collegiate "Conference's Most Valuable Player"
 2016 Shakey's V-League 13th Season Collegiate Conference "1st Best Middle Blocker"
 2016 UAAP Season 78 "Best Attacker"
 2016 Philippine Superliga All-Filipino "2nd Best Middle Blocker"
 2016 Philippine Superliga Grand Prix "Most Valuable Player"
 2017 UAAP Season 79 "Best Attacker"
 2017 UAAP Season 79 "Best Scorer"
 2017 UAAP Season 79 "Best Blocker"
 2017 Philippine Superliga All-Filipino "Best Opposite Spiker"
 2017 Premier Volleyball League 1st Season Collegiate Conference "Conference's Most Valuable Player"
 2017 Philippine Superliga Grand Prix "1st Best Opposite Spiker"
 2018 UAAP Season 80 "Season's Most Valuable Player"
 2018 UAAP Season 80 "Best Attacker"
 2019 Philippine Superliga All-Filipino "1st Best Middle Blocker"
 2021 Premier Volleyball League Open Conference "2nd Best Middle Blocker"
 2021 Premier Volleyball League Open Conference "Conference's Most Valuable Player"
 2021 Premier Volleyball League Open Conference "Finals' Most Valuable Player"
 2021-2022 Japanese V.League Division 1 "Best Blocker"

Clubs
 Shakey's V-League 12th Season Open Conference –  Champion, with PLDT Home Ultera Ultra Fast Hitters
 2015 Philippine Super Liga Grand Prix –  Champion, with Foton Tornadoes
 2016 Philippine Super Liga All-Filipino –  Runner-Up, with Foton Tornadoes 
 2016 Philippine Super Liga Grand Prix –  Champion, with Foton Tornadoes
 2017 Philippine Superliga Grand Prix –  Bronze medal, with Foton Tornadoes
 2019–20 V.League Division 1 Women's –  Bronze medal, with Ageo Medics
 2020–21 V.Cup Women's –  Champion, with Ageo Medics
 2021 Premier Volleyball League Open Conference –  Champion, with Chery Tiggo Crossovers

Special Recognition
 2014 FIVB Volleyball Women's World Championship qualification (AVC) "Miss Volleyball"

References

External links
 Volleyverse profile

1996 births
People from Cavite City
National University (Philippines) alumni
University Athletic Association of the Philippines volleyball players
Living people
Sportspeople from Cavite
Philippines women's international volleyball players
Filipino women's volleyball players
Middle blockers
Opposite hitters
Filipino expatriate sportspeople in Japan
Expatriate volleyball players in Japan
Competitors at the 2017 Southeast Asian Games
Volleyball players at the 2018 Asian Games
Ageo Medics players
Asian Games competitors for the Philippines
Filipino expatriate volleyball players
Competitors at the 2021 Southeast Asian Games
Southeast Asian Games competitors for the Philippines
LGBT volleyball players